Stepping stones or stepstones are sets of stones arranged to form an improvised causeway that allows a pedestrian to cross a natural watercourse such as a river; or a water feature in a garden where water is allowed to flow between stone steps. Unlike bridges, stepstone crossings typically have no spans, although wood planks or stone slabs can be placed over between the stones (which serve as the piers) to improvise as low-water bridges. Although their historical origin is unknown, stepping stones, along with log bridges, are likely to have been one of the earliest forms of crossing inland bodies of water devised by humans.

In traditional Japanese gardens, the term "iso-watari" refers to stepping stone pathways that lead across shallow parts of a pond, which work like a bridge-like slower crossing. Using iso-watari for crossing ponds, or shallow parts of streams, one can view the aquatic animals and plants around or in the pond, like carp, turtles, and waterfowls.

Today, stepping stones are commonly used by mountaineers and hikers as a makeshift way of crossing uncharted or unanticipated streams and torrents. They may occur alongside a ford.

Historic stepping stones

The Drukken Steps in the Eglinton Woods of North Ayrshire in Scotland were a favourite haunt of poet Robert Burns and his companion Richard Brown, while the two were living in Irvine from 1781 to 1782.

The name "Drukken" steps derives from a person's gait as they stepped from stone to stone whilst crossing the Red Burn. Seven or more stones were originally set in the Red Burn which was much wider than in 2009.

Burns himself used the Scots spelling "Drucken" rather than "Drukken". The ruins of the Drukken Steps are in the Eglinton Country Park.

In popular culture 
A deadly version of stepping stones involving glass tiles is featured in the 2021 South Korean series Squid Game as the fifth game played in the series.

See also 
 Clapper bridge
 Footbridge
 Ford (crossing)
 Kulgrinda

References

External links

Stepping stones on the River Ayr
Stepping stones on the Annick Water

Footbridges
Stone bridges
Garden features
Stonemasonry
Chinese gardening styles
Japanese style of gardening
River crossings